The stratosphere is a region of Earth's upper atmosphere.

Stratosphere may also refer to:
Stratosphere: Conquest of the Skies, a 1998 computer game
"Stratosphere gun", nickname for the U.S. Army 120 mm M1 gun
Stratosphere Las Vegas, a casino hotel in Las Vegas, Nevada
Suzuki Stratosphere, a concept motorcycle

Music 
Stratosphere Sound, a recording studio in New York City
Stratosfear, a 1976 album by Tangerine Dream
Stratosphere (Duster album), 1998
Stratosphere (Matt Sorum album), 2014
"Stratosphere", a song by Stratovarius